The 1951 San Jose State Spartans football team represented San Jose State College during the 1951 college football season.

San Jose State played as an Independent in 1951. The team was led by second-year head coach Bob Bronzan and played home games at Spartan Stadium in San Jose, California. They finished the season with a record of two wins, seven losses and one tie (2–7–1). Overall, the team was outscored by its opponents 106–222 for the season.

Schedule

Team players in the NFL
No San Jose State players were selected in the 1952 NFL Draft.

The following finished their San Jose State career in 1951, were not drafted, but played in the NFL.

Notes

References

San Jose State
San Jose State Spartans football seasons
San Jose State Spartans football